Kushida (串田) may refer to :
 Kushida River (櫛田川, Kushida-gawa), a major river that flows through central Mie Prefecture on the island of Honshū, Japan
 Kushida Station, a Kintetsu train station in Matsusaka, Mie, Japan
 144P/Kushida, a periodic comet discovered in January, 1994
 147P/Kushida–Muramatsu, a quasi-Hilda comet discovered in 1993
 5605 Kushida, a Main-belt Asteroid discovered on February 17, 1993
 Akira Kushida (born 1948), a Japanese vocalist
Fuki Kushida (18992001), Japanese activist and feminist
 Reiki Kushida, a Japanese astronomer
 Takashi Kushida (born 1935), a Japanese aikido master
 Yoshio Kushida (born 1957), a Japanese astronomer
 Kushida (wrestler) (Yujiro Kushida, born 1983), a Japanese professional wrestler

Japanese-language surnames